The 1938 Wimbledon Championships took place on the outdoor grass courts at the All England Lawn Tennis and Croquet Club in Wimbledon, London, United Kingdom. The tournament was held from Monday 20 June until Saturday 2 July 1938. It was the 58th staging of the Wimbledon Championships, and the third Grand Slam tennis event of 1938. Don Budge and Helen Moody won the singles title.

Finals

Men's singles

 Don Budge defeated  Bunny Austin, 6–1, 6–0, 6–3

Women's singles

 Helen Moody defeated  Helen Jacobs, 6–4, 6–0

Men's doubles

 Don Budge /  Gene Mako defeated  Henner Henkel /  Georg von Metaxa, 6–4, 3–6, 6–3, 8–6

Women's doubles

 Sarah Fabyan /  Alice Marble defeated  Simonne Mathieu /  Billie Yorke, 6–2, 6–3

Mixed doubles

 Don Budge /  Alice Marble defeated  Henner Henkel /  Sarah Fabyan, 6–1, 6–4

References

External links
 Official Wimbledon Championships website

 
Wimbledon Championships
Wimbledon Championships
Wimbledon Championships
Wimbledon Championships